Women in Northern Ireland are women who live in or are from Northern Ireland.  Among the notable women of Northern Ireland were Geraldine O'Regan and May Blood, a Catholic and a Protestant respectively. Both of them were active community leaders in Belfast, the administrative capital and largest city of Northern Ireland. Women in Northern Ireland have a variety of concerns in regards to their overall treatment in society. Some areas of concern include domestic violence, poverty, poor housing conditions, unemployment, and a wide array of larger political issues.

Historic feminism 
Irish women have had a long history of involvement in political movements throughout Ireland. In 1798, women were involved in the United Irish movement in a number of ways. For instance, they transported arms, kept the male Irish rebels fed and clothed, and would help to defend their camps. United Irish meetings were frequently held at women-owned public houses as well. The 1960s also saw heavy involvement from women in Northern Ireland in different civil rights campaigns. Irish women engaged in and organized numerous protests regarding housing and employment discrimination within the Catholic communities in Derry and Belfast. The emergence of The Troubles and the subsequent internment of Catholic men in August 1971 greatly impacted the lives of these women. Women began to represent the men in their community in a number of protests as well as develop strategies to warn their community of the army's location. Those women who would warn the community would later be known as 'hen patrols.'

Criminal justice system 
The latter half of the twentieth century saw a dramatic increase of women in Northern Ireland entering the criminal justice system. This was largely due to the conflicts between the republicans and unionists. Prior to 1976, the women who were imprisoned as a result of these conflicts were labeled political prisoners. When the policy of special categorization ended in 1976, these women were all labeled terrorists under the law. These women were mostly engaging in civil disobedient acts such as rent strikes, however many of them were brought into prison through the Emergency Powers Act with, 'aiding and abetting terrorism.'

The Roisin McAliskey case 
The arrest and incarceration of Belfast native Roisin McAliskey in 1996 gained international attention. Although never charged with a crime, McAliskey was reportedly interrogated for six days. McAliskey's detainment sparked outrage from a number of human rights organizations due to her treatment as a pregnant woman.

Present day 
Since the ceasefire of 1994, funding from the European Union enabled a number of community based women's group to come to fruition in Northern Ireland.

See also 
 Northern Ireland Women's Coalition

References

External links